National Register of Historic Places listings in the city of Baltimore, Maryland

The locations of the National Register properties and districts listed below (at least for all showing latitude and longitude coordinates below) may be seen in a map by clicking on "Map of all coordinates".

This list covers some of the properties in the independent city of Baltimore, but not those in the county of Baltimore surrounding the city.  The county actually does not include the city; the city is an independent county-equivalent.

Current listings
 

|}

See also
National Register of Historic Places listings in Maryland

References

History of Baltimore
West